The Double Life of Mr. Alfred Burton is a 1913 novel by the British writer E. Phillips Oppenheim.

Adaption
In 1919 it was adapted into a British film of the same title directed by Arthur Rooke and starring Kenelm Foss and Ivy Duke.

References

Bibliography
 Goble, Alan. The Complete Index to Literary Sources in Film. Walter de Gruyter, 199

1913 British novels
Novels by E. Phillips Oppenheim
British novels adapted into films
Methuen Publishing books